Brattvåg is a village in Ålesund Municipality in Møre og Romsdal county, Norway. The village is located on the Norwegian mainland, along the west side of the Samfjorden.

Brattvåg has three schools: one primary school, a lower secondary school, and an upper secondary school. Brattvåg Church is the main church for this area of the municipality. Brattvåg houses factories for both Kongsberg and Vard. Kongsberg Deck Machinery Brattvåg is the world's largest manufacturer of winches. The sports club Brattvåg IL is located in the village.

The newspaper Nordre is published in Brattvåg.

Prior to 2020, it was the administrative centre of the old Haram Municipality.

References

Villages in Møre og Romsdal
Ålesund